Indelible mark may refer to:

 Sacramental character, an indelible spiritual mark left by some sacraments according to Catholic theology
 the mark made by an indelible marker
 the mark left by indelible ink on the voter's forefinger during elections